1798 – The First Year of Liberty is an album of traditional Irish songs relating to the 1798 rebellion by the United Irishmen. All songs are sung by Frank Harte and some are accompanied on bouzouki, guitar and occasional bodhrán by Donal Lunny.

The album was released in 1998 to commemorate the bicentenary of the events and is accompanied by a detailed booklet about the rebellion and each of the songs on the album.

'The booklet, as well as containing a concise account of the rising, has biographies of all the leaders of the 1798 rebellion, and a handsome cover illustration. It has a substantial bibliography for those seeking further enlightenment, and it makes a useful complement to the more orthodox histories thereby listed.  In fact, it tells us what orthodox histories do not tell us; what those who suffered made of the events of 1798.'

Track listing
 Henry Joy
 General Munro
 Dunlavin Green
 By Memory Inspired
 Shan Van Vocht
 Father Murphy
 Croppies Lie Down
 Croppy Boy
 Ballyshannon Lane
 Wind That Shakes the Barley
 Roddy McCorley
 Bagnal Harvey's Farewell
 Bold Belfast Shoemaker
 Wheels of the World
 Henry Joy McCracken
 Bodenstown Churchyard
 Rights of Man

References

1998 albums
Covers albums
Frank Harte albums